Harvey J. Donaldson (September 15, 1848 – January 2, 1912) was an American manufacturer, banker and politician from New York.

Life
He was born on September 15, 1848, in Argyle,  Washington County, New York, the son of Samuel Donaldson (1814–1891) and Jane (Barkley) Donaldson (1814–1894). He attended the common schools, and then became a contractor, and in 1880 a paper manufacturer. Later he also engaged in banking.

He married Mary L. Zieley (1855–1883), but they had no children. After the death of his first wife, he married Martha V. Beattie, and they had one son, Russell Donaldson, who died in infancy. They lived in Ballston Spa, Saratoga County.

He was a member of the New York State Assembly (Saratoga Co., 1st D.) in 1888 and 1889.

He was a member of the New York State Senate from 1890 to 1895, sitting in the 113th, 114th, 115th, 116th (all four 18th D.), 117th and 118th New York State Legislatures (both 20th D.).

In April 1904, he was appointed as a State Canal Appraiser.

He died on January 2, 1912, in Ballston, New York.

Sources

1848 births
1912 deaths
Republican Party New York (state) state senators
People from Ballston Spa, New York
Republican Party members of the New York State Assembly
People from Argyle, New York
19th-century American politicians